The University of Glamorgan was a university based in South Wales prior to the merger with University of Wales, Newport, that formed the University of South Wales in April 2013. The university was based in Pontypridd, in Rhondda Cynon Taf, with campuses in Trefforest, Glyntaff, Merthyr Tydfil, Tyn y Wern (The Glamorgan Sport Park) and Cardiff. The university had four faculties, and was the only university in Wales which had no link with the University of Wales.

In July 2012 the University of Glamorgan and the University of Wales, Newport, announced that they had begun talks aimed at integrating the two institutions.

History
 
The University of Glamorgan was founded in 1913 as the South Wales and Monmouthshire School of Mines, a School of Mines based in Trefforest, Pontypridd, serving the large coal mining industry in the South Wales Valleys. The school was owned and funded by the major Welsh coal owners, through a levy of one tenth of a penny on each ton of coal produced by the companies involved. At the outset, the school had 17 mining diploma students, including three from China. The school was taken over by Glamorgan County Council during the Depression, and became Glamorgan Technical College in 1949, reflecting its expanding portfolio, and the Glamorgan College of Technology in 1958. By this time, the institution had expanded to offer a range of full-time, sandwich and part-time courses in science, technology and commerce, to which it added the first "Welsh for Adults" course in 1967. In 1970, the college became a polytechnic. 

In 1914 Glamorgan County Council created Glamorgan Training College to train women to teach. It originally only took women who lived locally but in 1947, when Ellen Evans was the principal, it became co-educational and in 1962 it also accepted male students. Three years later it changed its name to Glamorgan College of Education.

The Glamorgan College of Education in Barry merged with Glamorgan Polytechnic merged and it was re-named the Polytechnic of Wales in 1975, before being awarded university status as the University of Glamorgan in 1992.

Between 2003 and the merger, the university had been engaged in an active "growth strategy", merging with Merthyr Tydfil College in 2004/5 and forming a "strategic alliance" with the Royal Welsh College of Music and Drama in 2006, so that the Royal College became part of the 'Glamorgan Group' of institutions. In 2007,  "ATRiuM", a new facility for teaching and research in media, design and the arts was opened in Cardiff city centre. A new Students' Union building at the Treforest Campus was opened in September 2010.

Merger
In July 2012 the University of Glamorgan and the University of Wales, Newport, announced that they had begun talks aimed at integrating the two institutions. On 17 December 2012 it was announced that the name for the new university is the University of South Wales. The university at the time of the merger served around 21,500 students, with 10,227 registered as full-time undergraduates. The university offered around 200 courses and in 2009 claimed to have one of the highest graduate employment rates in Wales, reporting that 94.3% of 2007-08 graduates found employment within six months of graduation.

Campuses
The university had several campuses:

 Trefforest - the main campus played host to the bulk of academic departments and facilities, including the indoor sports centre and students union. It is accessed via Treforest railway station from either Cardiff, Merthyr or the Rhondda; regular bus services or the A470.
 Glyntaff - housed the Faculty of Health, Sport and Science. All Science and Sport subjects were based here, including Police Sciences and Nursing.
 Partner colleges - The university had specialised "partner colleges" throughout South Wales; for example, Barry College for aeronautical engineering.
 Merthyr Tydfil - Merthyr Tydfil College had become part of the University of Glamorgan Group (but not part of the university), although its focus remains on delivering Further Education rather than Higher Education.
Tyn y Wern - Was home to the new Glamorgan Sport Park.
 ATRiuM - The Cardiff School of Creative and Cultural Industries was based at a Cardiff campus located close to Cardiff Queen Street railway station.

Facilities
The halls of residence were based at the Treforest campus:

 Glamorgan Court - Built in 1996, with all the rooms in the hall buildings arranged into clusters of six en-suite bedrooms with a shared kitchen.
Mountain Halls Accommodation blocks opened in September 2011.

The Students Union was also on the Treforest campus. The Student Union was the home to a number of sports teams, sports clubs and societies as well as TAG, the student newspaper. The building opened in September 2010.

The Students’ Union was one of only 7 buildings in Wales to be awarded with an internationally recognized RIBA award in 2011.

The Union has also welfare, education and equality support and there was a democratic structure change to Student Council.

Additional educational facilities included a 24-hour PC lab, wireless internet access in specified areas, world class equipment for nursing courses (including life sized dummies that simulate human beings, from breathing to giving birth), a TV studio, an Aerospace Centre (with its own plane), an on-campus radio studio, and two theatres.

 Oriel Y Bont galleries, an art gallery that hosted a collection of Ernest Zobole paintings. In 2002 the gallery achieved Museum Status.
 Learning Resource Centre: The library of the university had books and all other media facilities as well as daily newspapers from around the country and journal articles. Online research journals such as Mintel and Keynotes are available for students to use for free.

Faculties and departments
 Cardiff School of Creative & Cultural Industries, the Atrium
 Animation
 Communication Design
 Drama
 Fashion and Retail Design
 Film, Photography and New Media
 Media, Culture and Journalism
 Music and Sound
 Faculty of Health, Sport & Science
 Astronomy
 Geography and the Environment 
 Health Sciences including Nursing and Chiropractic
 Life Sciences
 Physical Sciences (including Chemistry, Geology and Forensic Science)
 Police Sciences
 Social Work
 Sport

 Faculty of Business and Society
 Accounting
 Art Practice
 Business Management
 English and Creative Writing
 Event Management
 History
 Humanities and Social Sciences
 Law and Criminology
 Psychology
 Faculty of Advanced Technology
 Aerospace
 Built Environment
 Computing and Mathematics
 Engineering
 Lighting and Live Event Technology

Academic profile

Rankings and reputation
The last rankings showed that the University of Glamorgan was rated the top "new" university in Wales, and one of the top five Welsh universities, by the Sunday Times.

The bulk of full-time students entered through the UCAS system with A-levels or equivalent qualifications and many of the university's degree courses are selective in that they require specific A-levels or above average grades for entry.

A Next Generation Networks, IMS Experience Lab
One of only 20 UK business schools to get "excellent ratings" from the government.
Centre of Excellence in Mobile Applications and Services (CEMAS).
Research in biohydrogen production and wastewater treatment.
The first university in Wales to be awarded the Environmental ISO 14001.
The University of Glamorgan, with Cardiff University and South Wales Police, forms the Universities Police Science Institute (UPSI) - a unique organisation in the UK dedicated to research and training in police related matters. Specialists in police and forensic related matters are organised within the Glamorgan Centre for Police Sciences. The university has its own Crime Scenes Investigation House.
A £35 million (€46.7 million or $68.6 million) investment in the city of Cardiff, completed in 2007, houses the Atrium.
The university, along with Cardiff, Swansea, Aberystwyth and Bangor Universities is part of the St David's Day Group, which is dedicated to acting together drive forward the knowledge economy in Wales.
Glamorgan, in partnership with the University of Wales Newport, is leading the development of the University of the Heads of the Valleys Initiative (UHOVI)

Awards
 In November 2012, the University of Glamorgan was awarded the Times Higher Education award for "Outstanding Support for Students".
 Glamorgan was the first university in Wales, and only the 8th in the UK (in 2007), to have been awarded the nationally recognised Investor in People status, for staff training and development.
The Business School received Chartered Institute of Purchasing & Supply Centre of Excellence accreditation, being one of only 13 accredited centres in the UK.
 Glamorgan has received the first prize in the national competition for best course designs and teaching ability three times.
Electronic Product Engineering within the School of Electronics, and Environmental Technology and Management, have been designated "Centres of Expertise" for Wales.

Notable alumni

 Jayde Adams, comedian
 Mark Andrews, wrestler
 Sue Bale 
 Max Boyce 
 Kevin Brennan, politician
 Carole Bromley
 Richard James Burgess
 Roger Clark, American actor, the voice and motion capture of Arthur Morgan in Red Dead Redemption 2
 Maciej Dakowicz
 Emma Darwin, novelist
 Lorna Dunkley
 Gareth Evans, director
 Jill Evans
 Ben Green, comedian
 Eddie Hughes, politician
 Matthew Jarvis, rugby
 Caroline Jones, UKIP member of the National Assembly for Wales
 Sion Russell Jones
 Mark Labbett
 Benny Lim
 Nicola Miles-Wildin
 Darren Morris
 Gareth L. Powell
 Dan Rhodes
 Sion Russell Jones
 Catherine Thomas
 Rachel Trezise
 Nigel Walker, athlete
 Camilla Way
 Randii Wessen
 Tine Wittler
 Leanne Wood

See also 
 Calvert's Engine, an 1845 colliery beam engine, preserved outside the Trefforest campus, originally the School of Mines.

References

External links

 University of Glamorgan official website
 University of Glamorgan Student Union official website

 
Education in Cardiff
Educational institutions established in 1913
Universities in Wales
1913 establishments in Wales
Educational institutions disestablished in 2013
2013 disestablishments in Wales
Defunct universities and colleges in Wales
Universities established in the 1990s